The lists of schools in Northern Ireland are divided into several articles:

List of primary schools in Northern Ireland
List of secondary schools in Northern Ireland
List of grammar schools in Northern Ireland
List of integrated schools in Northern Ireland

See also
List of schools in the Republic of Ireland
List of Catholic schools in Ireland by religious order
List of schools in Scotland